Zakhm is a 1998 Indian Hindi-language drama film written and directed by Mahesh Bhatt and produced by Mahesh and Pooja Bhatt. The film stars Ajay Devgn, Kunal Khemu, Pooja Bhatt, Sonali Bendre and Nagarjuna.

Zakhm was awarded with the Nargis Dutt Award for Best Feature Film on National Integration. Devgn's performance won him his first National Film Award for Best Actor.

Plot 
Music director Ajay argues with his wife, Sonia. Sonia wants to give birth to their child in England whereas Ajay wants his child to be born in India and does not want to go to England (because of the insecurity caused by the Mumbai riots).

Ajay soon learns that his mother has been burned by a group of Muslim rioters while leaving a temple and is in a critical condition. In a flashback, the struggles that his mother had to undergo to raise her children are shown. She was in love with a Hindu film producer Raman Desai but was not allowed to marry him on account of her Muslim faith. He marries her but does not document or acknowledge their marriage as it was done without any traditional upholdings. As she had children with a Hindu man, naturally she lives her later life as a Hindu, even in front of her son.

After his father's sudden death caused by an accident on the day Ajay's younger brother is born, Ajay realizes his mother is a Muslim. She makes him promise to bury her according to her faith when she dies, for it is only through a proper burial that she will be able to find herself reunited with her lover in heaven. She also takes a promise from Ajay that he will never tell his brother about her real identity. Ajay's mother succumbs to the burns. Sonia learns about her mother-in-law's past life and decides not to leave Ajay. She stands by him and supports his decision to bury his mother. However, Ajay's task is impeded by a fundamentalist leader Subodhbhai, who wanted to make this a political issue and encouraged the Hindu youth to kill Muslims. Anand happens to be a youth leader and Ajay's younger brother. But when Anand learns of Subodhbhai's intentions, he stands by his brother's decision to bury their mom according to Islamic customs. Her body is buried as she had desired, and she reunites with Raman in heaven. At last, Ajay is seen releasing his mother's Mangalsutra in the sea, indicating the end of her life of struggle and meeting with her husband.

Cast 
 Ajay Devgn as Ajay Desai
 Kunal Khemu as young Ajay Desai
 Nagarjuna as Director Raman Desai, Ajay's father
 Pooja Bhatt as Noor Hussain Khan, Ajay's mother
 Sonali Bendre as Sonia Maheshwari, Ajay's wife
 Ashutosh Rana as Subodh Malgaonkar 
 Sharat Saxena as Inspector Pawar
 Akshay Anand as Anand Kumar Desai, Ajay's brother
 Avtar Gill as Isa
 Zafar Karachiwala
 Saurabh Shukla as Gurdayal Singh
 Madan Jain as Journalist Anwar
 Vishwajeet Pradhan as Senior Inspector Vishwajeet Yadav

Soundtrack 

The music was composed by M. M. Keeravani with lyrics by Anand Bakshi. The soundtrack was released by the HMV Audio Company. The composer selected Chitra for " Gali main aaj Chand nikala " but due to unknown reasons the song was later sung by Alka Yagnik.

Reception 
Mukhtar Anjoom of Deccan Herald wrote that "Mahesh Bhatt foolishly swerves and rams the brakes while cruising along a solid theme. By making it personalized, he fails to tackle the wider ramifications of divisive politics and fritters away the opportunity to make a masterpiece of his swansong".

Awards 
National Film Awards
Won: 1998 National Film Award for Best Actor – Ajay Devgn

Screen Awards
 Won: 1999 Screen Award for Best Actor – Ajay Devgn

TV series 
The story has been adapted into a TV series, named Naamkarann, airing on STAR Plus from September 2016.

References

External links 
 

1998 films
1990s Hindi-language films
1998 drama films
Films featuring a Best Actor National Award-winning performance
Films scored by M. M. Keeravani
Films directed by Mahesh Bhatt
Best Film on National Integration National Film Award winners
Indian drama films
Hindi-language drama films